Keykaleh (also known as Kepkaleh') is a village in Kamazan-e Sofla Rural District, Zand District, Malayer County, Hamadan Province, Iran. At the 2006 census, its population was 178, in 45 families.

References 

Populated places in Malayer County